Guillaume Veau was a thirteenth-century French trouvère. Three chansons courtoises are attributed to him in the Vatican manuscript Reg.lat.1490:

J'ai amé trestout mon vivant
Meudre achoison n'euc onques de chanter
S'amours loiaus m'a fait soufrir

The first two of these are unica, that is, they appear in no other source. They both end on a note other than the tonal centre of the first four phrases. The "moderately florid" melodies of all three are written in bar form.

References

Further reading
Holger Petersen Dyggve. Onomastique des trouvères. Ayer Publishing, 1973.

Trouvères
13th-century French people
Male classical composers